Boynton Beach Club is a 2005 American romantic comedy film directed by Susan Seidelman, produced by her and her mother Florence. Based on experiences of Florence and her widowed friend David Cramer at an adult enclave in Boynton Beach (a city in Palm Beach County, Florida), the film was scripted by Susan Seidelman and Coral Gables, Florida writer Shelly Gitlow.

Plot
Marilyn (Brenda Vaccaro) is a woman unexpectedly plunged into grief when her otherwise healthy husband is killed by Anita Stern (Renée Taylor), who was talking on her cell phone while backing her car out of a driveway. Marilyn is introduced to the Boynton Beach Bereavement Club by Lois (Dyan Cannon), a talkative and flirtatious decorator who also serves as the club's unofficial social director.

Meanwhile, Harry (Joseph Bologna) tutors the newly widowed Jack (Len Cariou) in the related skills of cooking and courtship, while Jack comes to terms with secret wishes he never knew his late wife had. Harry considers himself a ladies' man, but his confidence is temporarily shaken when an Internet "dream date" turns out to be a prostitute (Janice Hamilton). Jack eventually gives in to the interest from Sandy (Sally Kellerman), with whom he re-discovers his sexuality and capacity to love, but they have to overcome Sally's discomfort with being divorced and not widowed. Lois herself begins dating Donald (Michael Nouri), who fears his real profession as an exterminator may turn off Lois who thinks he's a real estate developer, while she fears letting him know her real age. After Marilyn faces Anita down over her loss, the other issues come to a head at the club's New Year's Eve party, modeled after the sock hops they all enjoyed in their youths.

Cast
 Joseph Bologna — Harry 
 Dyan Cannon — Lois
 Len Cariou — Jack
 Sally Kellerman — Sandy
 Michael Nouri — Donald
 Renée Taylor — Anita Stern
 Brenda Vaccaro — Marilyn
 Mal Z. Lawrence — Marty

Release
Shot in 2005, Boynton Beach Club premiered in the Hamptons International Film Festival in East Hampton, New York. It was then released to theaters in South Florida on March 17, 2006 and wider on August 4, playing in six states: New York, New Jersey, Connecticut, Missouri, Arizona and California.

The film's working title was The Boynton Beach Bereavement Club.

References
Holden, Stephen. The New York Times (August 4, 2006), p. B10: "Crazy Mixed-Up Teenagers Who Are All Well Past 60"
Lovece, Frank. Film Journal International (review)

External links
 
 

2005 films
2005 romantic comedy films
American romantic comedy films
Boynton Beach, Florida
Films scored by Marcelo Zarvos
Films directed by Susan Seidelman
Films set in Florida
Roadside Attractions films
2000s English-language films
2000s American films